Haddekuche is a traditional pastry made in Frankfurt, Hesse; Rhenish Hesse; and other parts of South Hessen, Germany. It closesly resembles a diamond-shaped gingerbread with a diamond-themed pattern imprinted on the pastry itself. The word "Haddekuche" is Hessian dialect for Standard German harter Kuchen meaning "hard cake". This is most likely because it tends to dry relatively quickly and then become very hard. 

Haddekuche has often been made and produced in Frankfurt by pretzel vendors that roam the Apfelwein bars in the city (primarily in Sachsenhausen, Heddernheim, and Niederursel) and other parts of the region, but availability of the pastry has diminished considerably over the years and some claim the pastry has almost gone extinct. One of the few bakeries left selling the pastry claims they only sell 30 of them a month across two branches, mostly to tourists. The diamond pattern on the pastry closely resembles the pattern of another item strongly associated with Hessen—the Geripptes drinking glass for Apfelwein. Owing to the baking process and the need to protect the pastry from damage during transport, the edges of the pastry are rounded.

The pastry is also featured in the popular 1980s song  ("the Hessians are coming!") by the Rodgau Monotones, in which they jokingly compare many Hessian delicacies such as Handkäse with more typical German cuisine.

Another use for the pastry is as a form of thickening agent in sauces with dishes such as Sauerbraten.

Literature 

 Rita Hens: Frankfurt: Reisen mit Insider-Tipps. Marco Lolo Verlag, Lonely Planet 2014.

References

Hessian cuisine
German pastries
Culture in Frankfurt